Anandapuram is a railway station on Birur–Talaguppa branch line of Bangalore–Arsikere–Hubli line. It is located in Shimoga district, Karnataka state, India. The station consists of two platforms, which are not well sheltered. It lacks many facilities including water and sanitation.

Location 
Anandapuram railway station serves Anandapuram village in Shimoga district. It pertains to Mysore railway division, part of South Western Railway zone of Indian Railways.

Services 
There are several trains to Mysore, Talaguppa, Bengaluru and Shimoga that stop at Anandapuram:

References

Railway stations in Shimoga district
Mysore railway division